Armor Hero Captor King, also known as Armor Hero Buwang, is a 2016 Korean-Chinese action fantasy adventure film directed by Zheng Guowei. It was released in China on October 2, 2016.

Plot

Cast
Lại Nghệ
Wang Changchang
Qu Haojun
Yu Xiaoling
Dai Xinlong
Liu Lijia
Jia Ru
Zhang Ziye
Wang Yongfeng
Wang Pengxuan

Reception
The film grossed  at the Chinese box office.

References

South Korean fantasy adventure films
Chinese fantasy films
2016 action films
2010s fantasy adventure films
2016 multilingual films
Chinese multilingual films
South Korean multilingual films
Tokusatsu films
2010s Japanese films
2010s South Korean films